La Sagesse des mythes is a series of French comic books based on Greek mythology. The series was created by the philosopher Luc Ferry and is published by Glénat Editions since 2016.

Creation 
The philosopher Luc Ferry used the title La Sagesse des mythes for a 2008 book where he argued for the relevance of Greek myths in the contemporary world. It was published in English in 2014 as The Wisdom of the Myths.

The idea to make a comic-book series came from the desire to provide the latest scholarship about Greek mythology in a popular form, as Ferry thought that popular presentations of the stories usually contain many errors. He initiated the project in collaboration with the publishing house Glénat Editions, based on Grenoble. At the launch of the project in 2016, 30 volumes were at the planning stage. Beginning with a three-part adaptation of the Epic of Gilgamesh, of which the first volume was published in November 2019, the series has included some stories from outside of Greek mythology.

Ferry's interpretations and retellings of the myths are influenced by Timothy Gantz and Jean-Pierre Vernant. All the stories are written by Ferry, who writes around 30 pages for each album, which  turns into manuscripts. The images are drawn in the ligne claire style and the colour scheme is intended to use colours associated with ancient Greece. The artists for the individual albums are chosen by Poli and Glénat's editorial director Benoît Cousin.

Volumes 
{| class="wikitable plainrowheaders sortable"
!scope="col"| TitleEnglish translation
!scope="col"| Art
!scope="col"| Colour
!scope="col"| Publication date
!scope="col" class="unsortable" | ISBN
|-
| The Iliad 1/3: The Apple of Discord
| 
| Stambecco
| 14 September 2016
| 
|-
| Prométhée et la boîte de PandorePrometheus and Pandora's Box
| Giuseppe Baiguera
| Simon Champelovier
| 14 September 2016
| 
|-
| Thésée et le MinotaureTheseus and the Minotaur
| Mauro De Luca
| 
| 2 November 2016
| 
|-
| Jason et la toison d'or 1/3: Premières armesJason and the Golden Fleece 1/3: First Weapons
| Alexandre Jubran
| Scarlett Smulkowski
| 2 November 2016
| 
|-
| Persée et la Gorgone MédusePerseus and the Gorgon Medusa
| Giovanni Lorusso
| Stambecco
| 8 March 2017
| 
|-
| Héraclès 1/3: La Jeunesse du HérosHeracles 1/3: The Hero's Youth
| 
| Chiara ZeppegnoArancia Studio
| 8 March 2017
| 
|-
| The Odyssey 1/4: Poseidon's Wrath
| Giovanni Lorusso
| Scarlett Smulkowski
| 13 September 2017
| 
|-
| The Iliad 2/3: The War of the Gods
| 
| Stambecco
| 13 September 2017
| 
|-
| AntigoneAntigone
| Giuseppe Baiguera
| 
| 8 November 2017
| 
|-
| The Birth of the Gods
| Federico Santagati
| Scarlett Smulkowski
| 8 November 2017
| 
|-
| Jason et la toison d'or 2/3: Le Voyage de l'ArgoJason and the Golden Fleece 2/3: The Voyage of the Argo
| Alexandre Jubran
| Scarlett Smulkowski
| 30 May 2018
| 
|-
| Oedipus
| Diego Oddi
| 
| 30 May 2018
| 
|-
| The Iliad 3/3: The Fall of Troy
| 
| Stambecco
| 19 September 2018
| 
|-
| Dédale et IcareDaedalus and Icarus
| Giulia Pellegrini
| Chiara ZeppegnoArancia Studio
| 19 September 2018
| 
|-
| The Misadventures of King Midas
| Stefano Garau
| 
| 14 November 2018
| 
|-
| The Iliad: Box Set Volumes 1 to 3
| 
| Stambecco
| 21 November 2018
| 
|-
| Jason et la toison d'or 3/3: Les Maléfices de MédéeJason and the Golden Fleece 3/3: The Wicked Spells of Medea
| Alexandre Jubran
| Scarlett Smulkowski
| 3 April 2019
| 
|-
| Tantale et autres mythes de l'orgueilTantalus and Other Myths of Pride
| Carlos Rafael Duarte
| Simon Champelovier
| 3 April 2019
| 
|-
| Orphée et EurydiceOrpheus and Eurydice
| Diego Oddi
| 
| 5 June 2019
| 
|-
| The Odyssey 2/4: Circe the Sorceress
| Giuseppe Baiguera
| Scarlett Smulkowski
| 4 September 2019
| 
|-
| Héraclès 2/3: Les Douze travauxHeracles 2/3: The Twelve Labours
| Carlos Rafael Duarte
| 
| 4 September 2019
| 
|-
| Jason et la toison d'or: Coffret Tomes 01 à 03Jason and the Golden Fleece: Box Set Volumes 1 to 3
| Alexandre Jubran
| Scarlett Smulkowski
| 13 November 2019
| 
|-
| Gilgamesh 1/3: Les Frères ennemisGilgamesh 1/3: The Enemy Brothers
| 
| Stambecco
| 13 November 2019
| 
|-
| Eros et PsychéEros and Psyche
| Diego Oddi
| 
| 13 November 2019
| 
|-
| The Odyssey 3/4: The Cunning of Penelope
| Giuseppe Baiguera
| Scarlett Smulkowski
| 4 March 2020
| 
|-
| DionysosDionysus
| Gianenrico Bonacorsi
| 
| 4 March 2020
| 
|-
| Bellérophon et la chimèreBellerophon and the Chimera
| Fabio Mantovani
| 
| 9 September 2020
| 
|-
| Héraclès 3/3: L'Apothéose du demi-dieuHeracles 3/3: The Apotheosis of the Demigod
| Carlos Rafael Duarte
| 
| 9 September 2020
| 
|-
| Gilgamesh 2/3: La Fureur d'IshtarGilgamesh 2/3: The Fury of Ishtar
| 
| Stambecco
| 25 November 2020
| 
|-
| Héraclès: Coffret Tomes 01 à 03Heracles: Box Set Volumes 1 to 3
| Carlos Rafael Duarte
| Chiara ZeppegnoArancia Studio
| 25 November 2020
| 
|-
| The Odyssey 4/4: The Triumph of Odysseus
| Giuseppe Baiguera
| Scarlett Smulkowski
| 25 November 2020
| 
|-
| The Odyssey: Box Set Volumes 1 to 4
| Giuseppe BaigueraGiovanni Lorusso
| Scarlett Smulkowski
| 25 November 2020
| 
|-
| AthénaAthena
| Carlos Rafael Duarte
| 
| 3 March 2021
| 
|-
| Narcisse & PygmalionNarcissus & Pygmalion
| Diego Oddi
| 
| 3 March 2021
| 
|-
| The Wars of Zeus
| Carlos Rafael Duarte
|
| 8 September 2021
| 
|-
| Sisyphe & AsclépiosSisyphus & Asclepius
| Gianenrico Bonacorsi
|
| 8 September 2021
| 
|-
| ApollonApollo
| Luca Erbetta
|
| 1 December 2021
| 
|-
| The Underworld: In the Kingdom of Hades
| Diego Oddi
| 
| 1 December 2021
| 
|-
| Aphrodite 1/2: Née de l'écume<small>Aphrodite 1/2: Born from the Foam</small>
| Giuseppe Baiguera
| Scarlett Smulkowski
| 23 March 2022
| 
|-
| Gilgamesh 3/3: La Quête de l'immortalitéGilgamesh 3/3: The Quest for Immortality
| 
| Filippo Rizzu
| 23 March 2022
| 
|-
| The Loves of Zeus
| Carlos Rafael Duarte
| Véronique Dorey
| 22 June 2022
| 
|-
| TyphonTyphon
| Federico Santagati
|
| 28 September 2022
| 
|-
| Aphrodite 2/2: Les Enfants de la déesseAphrodite 2/2: The Children of the Goddess
| Giuseppe Baiguera
| Scarlett Smulkowski
| 9 November 2022
| 
|-
| Roméo & JulietteRomeo & Juliet
| Gianenrico Bonacorsi
|
| 12 April 2023
| 
|-
| Lancelot 1Lancelot 1
| Carlos Rafael Duarte
| 
| 12 April 2023
| 
|}Prométhée et la boîte de Pandore, Thésée et le Minotaure, Persée et la Gorgone Méduse, Antigone, La Naissance des dieux, Tantale et autres mythes de l'orgueil and Orphée et Eurydice'' have also been republished through the book club .

References

External links 
 Official website 

2016 comics debuts
Classical mythology in comics
Comics set in ancient Greece
French comics titles